Arthur's Seat is an ancient volcano which is the main peak of the group of hills in Edinburgh, Scotland, which form most of Holyrood Park, described by Robert Louis Stevenson as "a hill for magnitude, a mountain in virtue of its bold design". Though it can be climbed from almost any direction, the easiest and simplest ascent is from the east, where a grassy slope rises above Dunsapie Loch. At a spur of the hill, Salisbury Crags has historically been a rock climbing venue with routes of various degrees of difficulty. Until recently rock climbing was restricted to the South Quarry, but access is currently banned altogether by Historic Environment Scotland.

Name 
It is sometimes said that its name is derived from legends pertaining to King Arthur, such as the reference in Y Gododdin. Some support for this may be provided by several other hilltop and mountaintop features in Britain which bear the same or similar names, such as the peak of Ben Arthur (The Cobbler) in the western highlands, sometimes known as Arthur's Seat, and Arthur's Chair on the ridge called Stone Arthur in the English Lake District. There is no traditional Scottish Gaelic name for Arthur's Seat in Edinburgh, but William Maitland proposed that the name was a corruption of Àrd-na-Said, implying the "Height of Arrows", which over the years became Arthur's Seat (perhaps via "Archer's Seat"). Alternatively, John Milne's proposed etymology of Àrd-thir Suidhe meaning "place on high ground" uncomfortably requires the transposition of the name elements.

Geology 
Arthur's Seat is the largest of the three parts of the Arthur's Seat Volcano site of special scientific interest (the other parts being Calton Hill and the Castle Rock) which is designated to protect its important geology (see below), grassland habitats and uncommon plant and animal species.

Like the rock on which Edinburgh Castle is built, it was formed by volcanic system of early Carboniferous age (lava samples have been dated at 341 to 335 million years old), which was eroded by a glacier moving from west to east during the Quaternary (approximately the last two million years), exposing rocky crags to the west and leaving a tail of material swept to the east. This is how the Salisbury Crags formed and became basalt cliffs between Arthur's Seat and the city centre. From some angles, Arthur's Seat resembles a lion couchant. Two of the several extinct vents make up the 'Lion's Head' and the 'Lion's Haunch'.

Arthur's Seat and the Salisbury Crags adjoining it helped form the ideas of modern geology as it is currently understood. It was in these areas that James Hutton observed that the deposition of the sedimentary and formation of the igneous rocks must have occurred at different ages and in different ways than the thinking of that time said they did. It is possible to see a particular area known as Hutton's Section in the Salisbury Crags where the magma forced its way through the sedimentary rocks above it to form the dolerite sills that can be seen in the Section.

The hill bears a strong resemblance to the Cavehill in Belfast in terms of its geology and proximity to a major urban site.

Human history 

A hill fort occupies the summit of Arthur's Seat and the subsidiary hill, Crow Hill.

Hill fort defences are visible round the main massif of Arthur's Seat at Dunsapie Hill and above Samson's Ribs, in the latter cases certainly of prehistoric date. These forts are likely to have been centres of power of the Votadini, who were the subject of the poem Y Gododdin, which is thought to have been written about 600 AD.
Two stony banks on the east side of the hill represent the remains of an Iron Age hill-fort and a series of cultivation terraces are obvious above the road just beyond and best viewed from Duddingston.

On 1 May 1590, to celebrate the safe return of James VI of Scotland and Anna of Denmark, a bonfire was lit that night on the Salisbury Crags fuelled with ten loads of coal and six barrels of tar.

A track rising along the top of the slope immediately under Salisbury Crags has long been a popular walk, giving a view over the city. It became known as the Radical Road after it was paved in the aftermath of the Radical War of 1820, using the labour of unemployed weavers from the west of Scotland at the suggestion of Walter Scott as a form of work relief. This route has been closed since 2018 after 50 tons of rock fell from the cliffs above.

In 1836 five boys hunting for rabbits found a set of 17 miniature coffins containing small wooden figures in a cave on the crags of Arthur's Seat. The purpose has remained a mystery ever since the discovery. A strong contemporary belief was that they were made for witchcraft, though more recently it has been suggested that they might be connected with the murders committed by Burke and Hare in 1828. There were 16 known victims of the serial-killers plus the first person sold "to the doctors", namely a man who had died of natural causes. However, the murder victims were primarily female, while the eight surviving figures are male. Alternatively, the coffins may have represented the 16 bodies sold to the doctors, plus that of the final victim who remained unburied at the time of the duo's arrest, but was, as a destitute beggar, very likely dissected in any case. The surviving coffins are now displayed in Edinburgh's National Museum of Scotland.

The prominence of Arthur's Seat over Edinburgh has attracted various groups and has a particular significance to the history of the Church of Jesus Christ of Latter-day Saints, because this is where the nation of Scotland was dedicated in 1840 "for the preaching of the gospel". The apostle, Orson Pratt, arrived in Scotland in early 1850 and climbed the hill to pray to God for more converts.

In 1884, alpine mountain guide Emile Rey visited Edinburgh where he climbed Arthur's Seat, local tradition stating that before doing so he estimated it would take much of the day to reach the top.

Mythology 

Arthur's Seat is often mentioned as one of the possible locations for Camelot, the legendary castle and court of the Romano-British warrior-chief, King Arthur.

Tradition has it that it was at the foot of Arthur's Seat, covered by the forest of Drumselch, that Scotland's 12th-century king David I encountered a stag while out hunting. Having fallen from his horse and about to be gored, he had a vision of a cross appearing between the animal's antlers, before it inexplicably turned away, leaving him unharmed. David, believing his life had been spared through divine intervention, founded Holyrood Abbey on the spot. The burgh arms of the Canongate display the head of the stag with the cross framed by its antlers.

The slopes of the hill facing Holyrood are where young girls in Edinburgh traditionally bathe their faces in the dew on May Day to make themselves more beautiful.  The poem "Caller Water" (fresh cool water), written by Robert Fergusson in 1773, contains the lines:

In popular culture 

The location features in The Scottish Chiefs, a book written by Jane Porter, published in 1921.

Arthur's Seat plays a prominent role in Scottish writer James Hogg's 1824 novel The Private Memoirs and Confessions of a Justified Sinner. Robert and George Colwan, two feuding brothers, are caught in a fog atop Arthur's Seat and witness what could be interpreted as a Brocken spectre, a strange phenomenon of the light, which causes George to believe that he is seeing a ghost. In the confusion, George nearly kills Robert, but they both escape to the bottom of the hill as the fog begins to clear.

In January 1829, in his "General Preface" to the Waverley Novels, Sir Walter Scott included Arthur's Seat among the "solitary and romantic environs" he roamed in the 1780s as a schoolboy with "a chosen friend", telling each other "interminable tales of knight-errantry and battles and enchantments",

Arthur's Seat has a passing mention as one of the sights of Edinburgh in the novel Frankenstein by Mary Shelley.

The 2009 novel One Day by David Nicholls begins and ends with the main characters, Emma and Dexter, climbing Arthur's Seat after their graduation from university. Arthur's Seat is shown at the end of the 2011 film One Day, which was based on the novel.

In Jules Verne's novel, The Underground City (or, The Child of the Cavern), Nell, a young girl who is an inhabitant of Verne's Underground City, is taken to Arthur's Seat to view her first sunrise. She has never before been above ground and is being acclimatized to life above ground.

In Catherine Sinclair's Holiday House, the children climb Arthur's Seat during a rare day away from their nurse. On the way down the children misbehave, almost causing Laura to fall over a cliff. She catches herself, and her brother comes to her rescue.

Arthur's Seat is featured in several of Ian Rankin's novels.

In Stephen Baxter's disaster novel Moonseed, the volcano reactivates and obliterates most of Edinburgh during the first act of Earth's eventual destruction.

The 17 coffins found on Arthur's Seat are the subject of Philip Caveney's 2014 teen fiction novel Seventeen Coffins.

In Julian May's Galactic Milieu series, Arthur's Seat has a central role as one of the sites of the Great Intervention. One of the main families in the series lives in Willowbrae on the slopes of the hill.

In Z. Rex, the first part of Steve Cole's The Hunting trilogy, Arthur's Seat is the first location that Zed and Adam Adler land after they reach Scotland, following their long flight across the Atlantic Ocean.

In the 2017 film, T2 Trainspotting, Ewan McGregor and Ewen Bremner ran up the hill to begin Spud’s detox.

See also 
 Arthurs Seat, Victoria, hill in Australia named for its resemblance to the Edinburgh Arthur's Seat.
 Mountains and hills of Scotland

References

External links 

Bartholomew's Chronological map of Edinburgh (1919)
 Walking guide to Arthur's Seat 
Computer generated summit panoramas Arthur's Seat index
University of Edinburgh Undergraduate Geology Notes, explains the Formation of Arthur's Seat  very well
Arthur's Seat Coffins at the National Museum of Scotland
The miniature coffins found in 1836
British Geological Survey report on the Arthur's Seat rockfall, Edinburgh, February 2007
Stuart McHardy, The Goddess in the Landscape of Scotland
 Virtual Tour around Arthur's Seat and Salisbury Crags

Archaeological sites in Edinburgh
Locations associated with Arthurian legend
Carboniferous volcanoes
Hills of Edinburgh
Marilyns of Scotland
The Church of Jesus Christ of Latter-day Saints in Scotland
Volcanic plugs of Scotland
Sites of Special Scientific Interest in Scotland
Carboniferous Scotland